Rui Manuel Trindade Jordão (9 August 1952 – 18 October 2019) was a Portuguese footballer.

His professional career was spent mostly with two of the biggest clubs in the country, Benfica and Sporting CP. One of the most prolific strikers in the history of Portuguese football, he won the Silver Ball award twice, once with each team.

Jordão represented the Portugal national team for 17 years, appearing with them at Euro 1984.

Club career
Born in Benguela, Portuguese Angola, Jordão moved in his teens to Portugal's S.L. Benfica, making his professional debut in 1971–72. He played 18 games and scored seven goals in his debut campaign, appearing slightly less in his second but still contributing five goals as the club won back-to-back Primeira Liga titles, only losing one match over two seasons.

Jordão signed with Spanish side Real Zaragoza in the summer of 1976, scoring regularly but being relegated from La Liga. Subsequently, he returned to his country of adoption and joined Sporting CP.

Jordão enjoyed his best years with the Lions, scoring in double figures in six of his first seven seasons, which included a total of 57 goals when the team won the league (1980 and 1982). At the age of 35 he moved to Vitória de Setúbal, reuniting with former Sporting teammate Manuel Fernandes, another prolific veteran goalscorer. He finished his career two years later, having scored 212 goals in the Portuguese top division alone.

International career
In early 1972, Jordão won the first of his 43 caps for Portugal, against Cyprus in the 1974 FIFA World Cup qualifiers. Also in that year he was picked for the squad that lost the Brazilian Independence Cup, 1–0 to hosts Brazil.

On 13 November 1983, Jordão scored the decisive goal to beat the Soviet Union, as the national side won 1–0 in Lisbon and qualified for UEFA Euro 1984. In the final stages they reached the semi-finals, where the player scored twice against hosts France in Marseille on 23 June – Portugal led 2–1 with only six minutes to go in extra time, after individual efforts and assists by Fernando Chalana, but eventually lost 3–2.

Jordão played his last international in 1989 at nearly 37, the same year of his club retirement. He had returned to the national team after several players were given punishments for the Saltillo Affair at the 1986 FIFA World Cup.

Later life
After he retired, Jordão moved away from the football world and became a painter and a sculptor. He died on 18 October 2019 at the age of 67, having been hospitalised with heart problems in Cascais. Fernando Gomes, the president of the Portuguese Football Federation, delivered a statement describing him as "peerless".

Career statistics

International

International goals

|}

Honours
Benfica
Primeira Liga: 1971–72, 1972–73, 1974–75, 1975–76
Taça de Portugal: 1971–72

Sporting CP
Primeira Liga: 1979–80, 1981–82
Taça de Portugal: 1977–78, 1981–82
Supertaça Cândido de Oliveira: 1982

Individual
Bola de Prata: 1975–76, 1979–80
Portuguese Footballer of the Year: 1980

References

External links

1952 births
2019 deaths
People from Benguela
Colonial people in Angola
Angolan emigrants to Portugal
Portuguese sportspeople of Angolan descent
Black Portuguese sportspeople
Angolan footballers
Portuguese footballers
Association football forwards
Primeira Liga players
S.L. Benfica footballers
Sporting CP footballers
Vitória F.C. players
La Liga players
Real Zaragoza players
Portugal youth international footballers
Portugal under-21 international footballers
Portugal international footballers
UEFA Euro 1984 players
Portuguese expatriate footballers
Expatriate footballers in Spain
Portuguese expatriate sportspeople in Spain